Luis Alberto Aguiriano Forniés (1 April 1940 – 23 June 2019) was a Spanish socialist politician. He served as a senator from 1977 to 1979 and from 1982 to 1986, as well as a member of the Congress of Deputies from 1986 to 2000.

Biography
He was born in Vitoria to a left-wing family which took part in the clandestine reorganization of the Álava branch of the Spanish Socialist Workers' Party during the Francoist dictatorship. José Antonio Aguiriano, who would also become a politician, was his older brother. He was elected to the Senate in the 1977 election, and again in 1982. In 1986 he was elected to the Congress of Deputies, where he served until 2000. He died in Vitoria-Gasteiz on 23 June 2019.

References

1940 births
2019 deaths
Basque politicians
Basque economists
Spanish Socialist Workers' Party politicians
Anti-Francoism
Prisoners and detainees of Spain
People from Vitoria-Gasteiz
Members of the 2nd Senate of Spain
Members of the 3rd Congress of Deputies (Spain)
Members of the 4th Congress of Deputies (Spain)
Members of the 5th Congress of Deputies (Spain)
Members of the 6th Congress of Deputies (Spain)
Basque Anti-Francoists